Tamikrest (Tamashek for junction, alliance, the future) is a group of musicians who belong to the Tuareg people. The band was founded in 2006 in Kidal, Mali. They mix traditional African music with Western rock and pop influences and sing in Tamashek. The main songwriter and leader of the band is Ousmane Ag Mossa.

Their music is characterized by electric guitars and vocals, youyous, bass, drums, djembé and other percussion instruments.

Band History 

When Tamikrest was founded in 2006, the musicians were all in their early twenties. They originate from the region around Kidal, a city in northern Mali. All of them visited the Les enfants de l'Adrar school in Tinzawaten, a small oasis in the middle of the desert, which was funded by European foundations. It was there that the future members of Tamikrest got their basic musical training. Their youth was shaped by the civil war that took place between 1990 and 1995. Many family members and friends died while the Tuareg fought for their autonomy. When new riots broke out in 2006, Ousmane Ag Mossa and his friend Cheick Ag Tiglia decided not to fight with weapons, but to call attention to the Tuareg's cause with musical means.

In their youth they played the traditional music of the Kel Tamasheq (as the Tuareg call themselves) and the songs of the Tuareg band Tinariwen, who already mixed African traditional music with western rock music in the eighties. Through the internet and mp3 culture, the Tamikrest members got to know bands and musicians like Jimi Hendrix, Bob Marley, Pink Floyd and Mark Knopfler who influenced the shaping of the special Tamikrest sound as well.

A chance meeting with the American-Australian band Dirtmusic at the Festival au Désert in 2008, which took place in Essakane (about 50 miles west of Timbuktu), led to a friendship and musical cooperation. When Dirtmusic recorded their second album, BKO, in a studio in Bamako (the capital of Mali) in 2010, Tamikrest were invited to play on that album. Chris Eckman (member of Dirtmusic and The Walkabouts) also produced Adagh, Tamikrest's first album. In 2010, both bands toured Europe together and played festivals like Sziget and Orange Blossom Special, the latter organized by their label Glitterhouse Records. In October 2010, Chris Eckman produced Tamikrest's second album Toumastin, which was released in April 2011.

Discography 
 2010 : Adagh (Glitterhouse Records)
 2011 : Toumastin (Glitterhouse Records)
 2013 : Chatma (Glitterbeat Records)
 2015 : Taksera (Glitterbeat Records)
 2017 : Kidal (Glitterbeat Records)
 2020 : Tamotait (Glitterbeat Records)

External links 

 
 This music was founded on a very precise cause – the Tuareg's: An interview by The Guardian.
 Community In Common Ground: An interview by Eye Plug.
 The Blues of the Desert: An interview on halalmonk.com.

References 

Malian musical groups
Tuareg culture
Berber culture
Glitterhouse Records artists